World Politics is a quarterly peer-reviewed academic journal covering political science and international relations. It is published by Cambridge University Press on behalf of the Princeton Institute for International and Regional Studies. Before 2003, it was sponsored by Princeton's Center of International Studies and before 1951, by the Yale Institute of International Studies. It was established in 1948. The editor-in-chief is Deborah J. Yashar (Princeton University).

It is considered a leading journal in International Relations and Comparative Politics. According to the Journal Citation Reports, the journal has a 2017 impact factor of 3.025, ranking it 6th out of 86 journals in the category "International Relations" and 11th out of 165 in the category "Political Science".

References

External links 
 
 World Politics at Project MUSE

International relations journals
Political science journals
Quarterly journals
Cambridge University Press academic journals
English-language journals
Publications established in 1948